Richard Randolph Machattie (1843 – 27 December 1902) was an Australian politician.

He was born at Bathurst to a medical doctor, and he attended Bathurst Grammar School. He became a government surveyor, generally in the Carcoar and Bathurst districts. In 1882 he was elected to the New South Wales Legislative Assembly for Bourke, but he was defeated in 1885. A squatter at Brewarrina from 1884, the 1890s drought forced him to abandon his properties. Machattie died at Bathurst in 1902.

References

 

1843 births
1902 deaths
Members of the New South Wales Legislative Assembly
19th-century Australian politicians